Valentin Sébastien Roger Roberge (born 9 June 1987) is a professional footballer who plays for Cypriot club Apollon Limassol FC as a centre-back.

Born in France, he represents Cyprus at international level.

Club career

Early years
Born in Montreuil, Seine-Saint-Denis, Roberge had spells with hometown's ESD Montreuil, Les Lilas FC and Paris FC before joining En Avant Guingamp for his senior debut, but he went on to appear only for the reserve side.

For the 2007–08 season he signed with Paris Saint Germain FC, but met the exact same fate.

Aris and Marítimo
In the summer of 2008, Roberge signed for Aris Thessaloniki FC, penning a three-year contract. He made his debut against Panathinaikos F.C. but, midway through his second year in the Super League Greece, an economic crisis took hold of the club, and he went five months without being paid before his link was terminated.

Following his release, Roberge moved to Portugal's C.S. Marítimo after a successful trial. He started in all of his 25 Primeira Liga appearances in the 2011–12 campaign, helping the Madeirans to finish fifth and qualify for the UEFA Europa League.

Sunderland
On 10 June 2013, Premier League side Sunderland announced the signing of Roberge on a free transfer. He made his debut on 17 August in a 0–1 home defeat against Fulham, and scored his first goal on 24 September in the 2–0 home win over Peterborough in the League Cup, heading in an Adam Johnson cross.

Roberge left the Stadium of Light in June 2016, with only 13 competitive matches to his credit.

Apollon Limassol
Roberge joined Apollon Limassol FC in the 2016 off-season. He won several accolades during his spell, including the Cypriot First Division in 2021–22.

International career
In September 2022, Roberge became a Cypriot citizen. He won his first cap for the national team on the 24th at the age of 35, in a 1–0 victory against Greece in the UEFA Nations League. He scored his first goal three days later, but in a 5–1 loss in Kosovo in the same competition.

Career statistics

Honours
Apollon Limassol
Cypriot First Division: 2021–22
Cypriot Cup: 2016–17; runner-up: 2017–18
Cypriot Super Cup: 2016, 2017, 2022

References

External links

1987 births
Living people
Cypriot people of French descent
Sportspeople from Montreuil, Seine-Saint-Denis
French footballers
Cypriot footballers
Association football defenders
Ligue 1 players
Stade de Reims players
Super League Greece players
Aris Thessaloniki F.C. players
Primeira Liga players
C.S. Marítimo players
Premier League players
Sunderland A.F.C. players
Cypriot First Division players
Apollon Limassol FC players
Cyprus international footballers
French expatriate footballers
Expatriate footballers in Greece
Expatriate footballers in Portugal
Expatriate footballers in England
Expatriate footballers in Cyprus
French expatriate sportspeople in Greece
French expatriate sportspeople in Portugal
French expatriate sportspeople in England
French expatriate sportspeople in Cyprus